Kekkonen's fourth cabinet was the 36th government of Finland, and it lasted from 9 August 1953 to 17 November 1953. It was a majority government headed by Urho Kekkonen.

Ministers 
Key
  Died in office

References

 

Kekkonen, 4
1953 establishments in Finland
1953 disestablishments in Finland
Cabinets established in 1953
Cabinets disestablished in 1953
Cabinet 4